Taipa Fortress is a historical fortress in Northwestern Taipa, Macau, China.

History
The fortress was built in 1846 to defend against pirate attacks. It was later turned into a summer residence for the governor of Macau. The police station of the Municipality of das Ilhas was situated here from 1975 to 1998. Currently, apart from being a garden, it serves as the headquarters for the Macau Scouting Association.

See also
Fortaleza do Monte
Mong-Há Fort
Guia Fortress

References

Taipa
Buildings and structures in Macau